Dieppe Barracks is a military base of the Singapore Armed Forces (SAF) located along Sembawang Road in Singapore near Khatib Camp and Sembawang Air Base. It is currently occupied by HQ Guards.

History
Dieppe Barracks was built in the 1960s by the British Armed Forces for the Royal Marines and became operational in 1962. It was occupied by the 40 Commando Royal Marines of the 3 Commando Brigade from 1962 to 1971.

After the British Armed Forces left Singapore, Dieppe Barracks was handed over to the New Zealand Force South East Asia (NZFORSEA). The 1st Battalion Royal New Zealand Infantry Regiment, which was based in the nearby Nee Soon Camp, then occupied Dieppe Barracks from 1971 to 1989.

When the NZFORSEA departed Singapore in 1989, Dieppe Barracks was then handed over to the Singapore Armed Forces and it has been occupied by HQ Guards since then.

References

New Zealand
Installations of the New Zealand Army
Camps and bases of the Singapore Armed Forces